Hoyleton is a village in Washington County, Illinois, United States. The population was 531 at the 2010 census. It is the hometown of former Montréal Expos and San Francisco Giants left-handed pitcher Kirk Rueter.

Geography
Hoyleton is located in Illinois, United States of America. .

Demographics

As of the census of 2000, there were 520 people, 186 households, and 130 families residing in the village. The racial makeup of the village was 94.81% White, 3.85% African American, 0.38% Asian, and 0.96% from two or more races. Hispanic or Latino of any race were 0.38% of the population.

There were 186 households, out of which 32.8% had children under the age of 18 living with them, 59.1% were married couples living together, 5.9% had a female householder with no husband present, and 29.6% were non-families. 26.9% of all households were made up of individuals, and 13.4% had someone living alone who was 65 years of age or older. The average household size was 2.47 and the average family size was 2.99.

In the village, the population was spread out, with 27.9% under the age of 18, 9.2% from 18 to 24, 25.4% from 25 to 44, 19.8% from 45 to 64, and 17.7% who were 65 years of age or older. The median age was 34 years. For every 100 females, there were 100.0 males. For every 100 females age 18 and over, there were 89.4 males.

The median income for a household in the village was $43,250, and the median income for a family was $50,357. Males had a median income of $35,000 versus $18,558 for females. The per capita income for the village was $16,543. About 2.5% of families and 6.5% of the population were below the poverty line, including 6.6% of those under age 18 and 4.3% of those age 65 or over.

References

Villages in Illinois
Villages in Washington County, Illinois